Oluwole Akinyele Agbede is a professor of Water resources and Geotechnical engineering at the University of Ibadan. He is a fellow of the Nigerian Academy of Science who was elected into the Academy's Fellowship at its Annual General Meeting held in January 2015.
He received a bachelor's degree in Applied  Geophysics in 1976 and master's degrees in Engineering Geology in 1982 from Obafemi Awolowo University, Ile Ife and a doctorate degree in Civil engineering from City University London in 1985.

References

Living people
Academic staff of the University of Ibadan
Year of birth missing (living people)
Obafemi Awolowo University alumni